The 2000–01 season of the Jupiler League began on August 12, 2000 and ended on May 20, 2001.  Anderlecht became champions.

Promoted teams

These teams were promoted from the second division at the start of the season:
Antwerp (second division champion)
Louviéroise (playoff winner)

Relegated teams
These teams were relegated to the second division at the end of the season:
Harelbeke
KV Mechelen

Final league table

Results

Top scorers

See also
2000–01 in Belgian football

References
 Sport.be website - Archive

Belgian Pro League seasons
Belgian
1